Warren Redman Ryan (born 27 October 1941) is an Australian former professional rugby league football coach and player. He is considered one of the most influential rugby league coaches of the 20th century. Ryan also played in the NSWRFL Premiership for the St George Dragons and Cronulla-Sutherland Sharks.

He was formerly employed as a colour commentator by ABC Radio 702 for its Rugby League coverage. Ryan also formerly contributed opinion articles to the Brisbane Courier-Mail and Newcastle Herald.

Athletics
Ryan was also an elite track and field athlete, representing Australia in the 1962 British Empire and Commonwealth Games in the shot put coming seventh in a field of sixteen with a throw of 51'8" (15.75m).
Ryan accredits his famous attention to detail in his coaching to his Czech-born track coach of this time.

Rugby league

Playing career 
Warren Ryan was a St. George Dragons lower grade player. He played in the Dragons 1965 reserve grade grand final, and appeared in first grade on a number of occasions as a replacement during 1966. 

In 1967, he switched to the Cronulla Sharks in their debut season and became a regular in first grade, and was club Captain at different times during 1967–68.

In 1969 he moved to Wollongong Wests and had four seasons there, the final two as captain-coach. He captained N.S.W. Country in 1972.

Broadcaster and journalist
Warren Ryan wrote for the Sydney Morning Herald for many years as a sports journalist. He is also a former member of the ABC Grandstand rugby league commentary team; where, rather than calling the match play itself, he supplied special comments throughout the broadcast.

Ryan used the term "old darky" during the call of an NRL match between the Roosters and Bulldogs. He claimed he was quoting a scene from Gone with the Wind. After listeners' complaints, he was stood down from the ABC with his colleague David Morrow pending an investigation. The scene he claimed to refer to is the 'quittin' time' scene in which a slave calls quittin' time, presuming the role of the foreman. Having asserted his rights, the foreman immediately calls 'quittin' time!' The incident involving Ryan made headlines, while notable indigenous leaders called for an investigation. While the investigation continued, Warren Ryan resigned. He had intended to retire at the end of the 2014 season, but brought it forward rather than face the results. Refusing to address the use of a racist term, Ryan said, "The word used to describe the character was a direct quote from the film. There was no offence intended, so I won't be apologising. It would be insincere. Furthermore, there is no appeasing those who are determined to be offended. So that's it. I've had a long run and, for the most part, it's been very enjoyable."

He proposed his own finals system, an alternative to McIntyre Final Eight and AFL, but it was not accepted.

Personal life
In addition to his rugby league career, Ryan was also a long-time physical education teacher at Belmore Boys High School in Sydney's southwest. 

In April 2006, Ryan's son Matthew died of heart failure at age 24 following an overdose of the party drug, gamma hydroxybutyrate (GHB).

On 11 November 2016, Ryan was charged with assault occasioning actual bodily harm after an altercation at Pagewood Hotel. Ryan had allegedly assaulted the 75-year-old man over an argument regarding the outcome of the 2016 United States presidential election. On 23 October 2017, Ryan was found guilty of common assault at Waverley Local Court and was put on a 12-month good behaviour bond.

References

1941 births
Living people
Athletes (track and field) at the 1962 British Empire and Commonwealth Games
Australian male shot putters
Australian people convicted of assault
Australian rugby league coaches
Australian rugby league commentators
Australian rugby league players
Balmain Tigers coaches
Canterbury-Bankstown Bulldogs coaches
Commonwealth Games competitors for Australia
Cronulla-Sutherland Sharks players
Newcastle Knights coaches
Newtown Jets coaches
Place of birth missing (living people)
Rugby league centres
Rugby league locks
St. George Dragons players
Western Suburbs Magpies coaches